Old Presbyterian Church may refer to:

in the United States
(by state)
Old Presbyterian Church (Parker, Arizona), listed on the NRHP in Arizona
Old Presbyterian Church (Barnwell, South Carolina), listed on the NRHP in South Carolina

See also
List of Presbyterian churches
Presbyterian Church (disambiguation)
First Presbyterian Church (disambiguation), includes several named "Old First Presbyterian Church"